Flintbek is an Amt ("collective municipality") in the district of Rendsburg-Eckernförde, in Schleswig-Holstein, Germany. The seat of the Amt is in Flintbek.

The Amt Flintbek consists of the following municipalities:

Böhnhusen 
Flintbek
Schönhorst 
Techelsdorf

References

Ämter in Schleswig-Holstein